St. Koloman station is a railway station in the St. Koloman district of the municipality of Wörth, located in the Erding district in Upper Bavaria, Germany.

References

External links

Munich S-Bahn stations
Railway stations in Bavaria
Railway stations in Germany opened in 1890
1890 establishments in Bavaria
Buildings and structures in Erding (district)